Dale Wesley Matthewson (May 15, 1923 – February 20, 1984) was a professional baseball player. He was a right-handed pitcher over parts of two seasons (1943–44) with the Philadelphia Phillies. For his career, he compiled an 0–3 record, with a 4.34 earned run average, and 16 strikeouts in 58 innings pitched.

Matthewson was born in Catasauqua, Pennsylvania and died in Blairsville, Georgia at the age of 60.

References

External links

1923 births
1984 deaths
Philadelphia Phillies players
Major League Baseball pitchers
Baseball players from Pennsylvania
Rome Colonels players
Trenton Packers players
Knoxville Smokies players
Louisville Colonels (minor league) players
Birmingham Barons players
Jersey City Giants players
San Francisco Seals (baseball) players
Mobile Bears players
Gadsden Chiefs players
Danville Leafs players
Tampa Smokers players
Macon Peaches players
Tulsa Oilers (baseball) players
People from Blairsville, Georgia
Sportspeople from Lehigh County, Pennsylvania